The Gnasher Shotgun,  also known as simply the Gnasher, is a fictional firearm weapon featured in the Gears of War video game franchise. First appearing in the original Gears of War, the Gnasher is the standard-issue shotgun for Coalition of Ordered Governments ("COG") soldiers, although it is also carried by the enemy Locust Horde, particularly the Grenadier class of Locust Drone.

Because of its wide spread and high power, the Gnasher is traditionally one of the most used weapons in the series' multiplayer modes. It is also widely regarded as a controversial and divisive firearm in weapon balance debates. The developers of the Gears of War series have on a number occasions responded to player feedback about the Gnasher Shotgun, with its ammo capacity, magazine size, and firepower downgraded and upgraded through gameplay updates due to balance concerns. The Gnasher was also affected by technical issues which manifested as a lack of consistency for hit-detection in Gears of War: Ultimate Edition and Gears of War 4, which prompted the developers to investigate and fix the issue.

Characteristics 
The Gnasher Shotgun is a short-barreled, stockless, lever-action military shotgun. It fires 12-gauge buckshot rounds, spraying nine pellets of shot per shell in a cone, making it highly effective in close-combat situations. Enemy bodies fall apart at the player's feet upon death, as opposed to flying back in a shower of gore. The melee execution animation for the Gnasher, introduced in Gears of War 2, involve the wielder grabbing the shotgun by the barrel and smashing the downed enemy's head with the butt of the shotgun. From Gears of War 4 onwards, the Gnasher wielder executes the downed enemy by stomping on their right leg, and smashing the victim's head into a bloody pulp with the butt of the shotgun as they flinch upright.

The Gnasher Shotgun has had a reputation as a highly effective weapon in multiplayer games since the first Gears of War. While it is inefficient at long distances, it is a popular weapon of choice at close-quarters as it is small and easy to aim, making it exceptionally useful for close-range combat. Within the series, reloading a firearm weapon involve a mechanic called active reloading: hitting the reload button for the second time within range of the white bar in the upper right corner of the user interface screen grants the player a damage boost for all weapons. Successful active reloads with the Gnasher Shotgun renders it one of the most deadly weapons in the series, as it reloads quickly and is capable of killing its targets with one well-placed shot.

Community director Adam Fletcher acknowledged that while the Gears series "has always been known for Gnashers", he claimed that players who are new to the series starting from Gears of War 4 do not always have to use the Gnasher and that they should find a gun that they think will work well with their playstyle.

Development

During his term of employment at Epic Games, the original developers for the Gears of War series, senior gameplay designer for the original Gears of War trilogy Lee Perry developed a term for the area very near a player called "Beyond Melee range", which is also the optimal range for the usage of shotgun weapons in the series.

In a 2015 interview with journalist Edwin Evans-Thirlwell, Perry said the Gridlock map, a horseshoe-shaped environment with wrecked cars strewn artfully across the centre, was the centerpiece of the developers' original vision for the game's multiplayer mode as a trench warfare simulation, with its focus on "flanking actions and covering fire". The popularity of the Gnasher shotgun and its playstyle which emphasizes close range combat came as a shock to Epic Games, as Gridlock was designed to "encourage symmetrical battlefronts and readable mid-range clashes", while the game's "tanky handling and aiming" served as an incentive for players to keep their distance. Prior to their departure from the franchise, Epic Games made attempts to rein in the Gnasher's firepower via updates, but were often met with backlash from players. Perry noted in retrospect that "the Gnasher was the hardest thing to get right in the entire series", and expressed a belief that the complications are a fundamental aspect of closed ranged combat in a third-person shooter game.

For Gears 5, developer The Coalition introduced the Arcade mode, which is intended to make its multiplayer mode more accessible to players who traditionally avoided Gears multiplayer by assigning passive skills to its roster of characters as well as unique loadouts and upgrade paths. The Coalition made alterations to some of the Gnasher's damage numbers in a patch that went live on February 11, 2020 as part of their on-going mechanics updates; the developers claimed that the changes were made to improve combat experience and "make the game both more fun and more skillful". The Gnasher's maximum range was increased, while instant-kill distant was reduced along with the damage for a direct hit, meaning that players would need to be closer in order to decimate their target. A further update in April 2020 reverted most of the changes made to the Gnasher from the February 2020 update, as the Coalition noting that it was feeling inconsistent since the last update. The shotgun's bullet magnetism range is increased and its "gib-range calculation" system has also been temporarily disabled due to a bug which affects gameplay balance.

Perry response
In a lengthy post published in response to a weapon balance debate about the multiplayer mode for Gears of War 3 on the Epic Games forums in October 2011, Perry clarified that the "Beyond Melee range" is not meant to be a "specific technical term describing a precise range equal to that of your weapon bonk", as such specific data would not be included in the interface as weapon attributes can change with recurring gameplay updates. Perry acknowledged in his post that the Gnasher Shotgun is the game's most powerful weapon, but rejected the notion that the Gnasher is overpowered or "broken" and drew a comparison to a "fighting game with one character that everyone uses and is clearly the best." He argued that experienced players who are skilled with the weapon should win games on average or lose to other players who are also skilled with Gnashers. Perry explained in his post that it is preferable that skilled players perceive less skilled players as a potential threat than no threat at all, arguing that "a game where you're never effective is one you won't go back to" particularly if the player feels outclassed in a match, and insisting that there has to be "moments of success for everyone". On the other hand, he opined that a "variety of play styles makes the game more fun for players of all types, even Gnasher players who might not realize it." He said that while a convincing argument can be made that "Gears is a game about Gnashers", he also argued out that the "overall Gears multiplayer, is not that experience." He concluded that the Gnasher "is clearly the way to go for those skilled in its use", but encouraged players to change their mindset when they suffer the occasional loss to a less skilled player.

Perry also commented on the Sawed-Off Shotgun, another shotgun variant which is devastating at close range but ineffective at medium to long range. Noting that the Sawed-Off Shotgun has drawn criticism due to its perceived ability to allow new players "to achieve cheap kills" and that it has been nicknamed the "Anti-Gnasher", he explained that there are players who are unable to utilize an effective playstyle with the Gnasher in spite of regular practice; the Sawed-Off Shotgun is meant to be an effective backup option for those players, "a useful tool to keep in that half of the inventory, and a means of mixing up the combat" in Perry's words. He noted that the tactic of "hiding around corners" as opposed to running straight at opponents is not "the sole domain of the Sawed-off", but in fact has long been favored by players who primarily utilize the Gnasher, the Mark 2 Lancer and even grenades, as the games' camera position play a role in encouraging this tactic.

Technical issues
Prior to an update released in late September 2015, the Gnasher occasionally failed to register damage from point-blank range in the multiplayer mode for Gears of War: Ultimate Edition. The issue was considered to be unrelated to latency issues as it was also noted to occur on local split-screen multiplayer. The Coalition, the developers for Ultimate Edition, previously indicated that the Gnasher works the same way it did in the original game, as the way the shotgun pellets were distributed when firing was randomized. In response to player feedback, the studio's community head announced on September 16, 2015 that the Gnasher's consistency would be improved in a forthcoming patch. On September 24, 2015, a title update was announced by the Coalition, which read as follows:

A similar issue with the Gnasher Shotgun's inconsistency at point blank range was also reported for Gears of War 4. Multiplayer design director Ryan Cleven announced the developers' findings following an investigation, where he explained that the bullets from the Gnasher were designed to fire from further back the weapon, as opposed to leaving the gun from the muzzle, in order to prevent players from being able to shoot through walls. Cleven claimed that The Coalition would be making mechanical changes to the Gnasher to improve its close-range consistency, moving its pellets a little farther forward to create a tighter spread while still checking for wall collision.

Appearances
The Gnasher Shotgun has been featured in every Gears of War title since its appearance in the first Gears of War, its aesthetic design relatively unchanged with each appearance. Although the weapon is mostly associated with the COG government as it is a standard issue shotgun for its troops, it is also regularly utilized by the Locust, Lambent, and Stranded factions in the original Gears of War trilogy.

The Gnasher is a staple choice for the multiplayer modes of Gears of War games. It is also the default weapon for the Scout class in Gears Tactics.

Reception
Several critics agree that the Gnasher Shotgun is the most popular weapon in multiplayer modes for the Gears of War series. It is also considered to be the most divisive weapon in the series. Nicholas Bashore from Inverse ranked the Gnasher Shotgun as the second best weapon in the Gears of War series.

In reference to its infamous reputation for giving aggressive players a perceived advantage, Edwin Evans-Thirlwell called the Gnasher "the dark god of shotguns". In an article he wrote for Eurogamer, Evans-Thirlwell remarked that its enduring popularity contradicts assumptions about the series' "unsuitability on paper as a platform for close-quarters duelling". He remarked that for many players, the Gnasher's ability to evaporate anything within close range is "just too inviting to spend all day lurking in cover", noting that its capacity to break ranks among players tramples the developer's best intentions in their quest for a competitive edge. He expressed a personal preference for the Gnasher's superior firepower in comparison to the Lancer Assault Rifle. Sherif Saed from VG247 welcomed the July 2019 announcement of the Arcade mode for Gears 5, noting the similarity of its features to a hero shooter and remarked that this is the developers' way of "diversifying the action and preventing matches from devolving into Gnasher shotguns 24/7".

The Gnasher's technical issues in Gears of War: Ultimate Edition and Gears of War 4 has received particular attention. Chris Pereira from GameSpot highlighted players' frustration from firing the Gnasher prior to the fix, as it was undependable for achieving a specific amount of damage with each shot. Patricia Hernandez from Kotaku expressed exasperation at the inconsistency of shotgun rounds being fired at point blank range, and emphasized the severity of the problem as the shotgun is the most-used multiplayer weapon. She responded well to the Coalition's to address the technical issues, including a bug which cause Gnasher shots being registered as headshots which she was not previously aware of. Wesley Yin-Poole from Eurogamer expressed puzzlement where the Gnasher sometimes kill the player's opponent, and that other times some of the pellets would miss where they should hit in Gears of War 4. Yin-Poole commented that clipping issues are not an uncommon issue in video games where a weapon will "bleed" through a wall as a glitch, which occasionally lets the player shoot through walls if the muzzle can stick through far enough, though he reckoned the game's in-game geometry should have prevented it.

References

External links

Gears of War
Fictional elements introduced in 2006
Fictional firearms
Science fiction weapons
Video game objects